Corruption in Turkey is an issue affecting the accession of Turkey to the European Union.  Transparency International's Corruption Perception Index scores 180 countries according to their perceived level of public sector corruption on a scale of 0 (very corrupt) to 100 (very honest). Since the current scale was introduced in 2012, Turkey's score has fallen from its highest score of 50 (2013) to its lowest, current score of 36 (2022). When the 180 countries in the Index were ranked by their score (with the country perceived to be most honest ranked 1), Turkey ranked 101 in 2022.

The 1998 Türkbank scandal led to a no-confidence vote and the resignation of Prime Minister Mesut Yılmaz. Although Yılmaz was investigated by Parliament, a five-year statute of limitations prevented further action. On 17 December 2013, the sons of three Turkish ministers and many prominent businesspeople were arrested and accused of corruption.

Anti-Corruption Legislation
Anti-Corruption legislation includes Turkey's Criminal Code which criminalizes various forms of corrupt activity, including active and passive bribery, attempted corruption, extortion, bribing a foreign official, money laundering and abuse of office. Nevertheless, anti-corruption laws are poorly enforced, and anti-corruption authorities are deemed ineffective.

See also
2011 Turkish sports corruption scandal
2013 corruption scandal in Turkey
Crime in Turkey
Lost Trillion Case
Media of Turkey
Türkbank scandal
International Anti-Corruption Academy
Group of States Against Corruption
International Anti-Corruption Day
ISO 37001 Anti-bribery management systems
United Nations Convention against Corruption
OECD Anti-Bribery Convention
Transparency International

References

External links

 Turkey Corruption Profile from the Business Anti-Corruption Portal

 
Turkey